Jesse Ratcliff House is a historic home located near Barnett, Morgan County, Missouri. It was built between 1861 and 1864, and is a two-story, cut limestone I-house.  It has a medium side gable roof and interior end chimneys.

It was listed on the National Register of Historic Places in 1982.

References

Houses on the National Register of Historic Places in Missouri
Houses completed in 1864
Buildings and structures in Morgan County, Missouri
National Register of Historic Places in Morgan County, Missouri